Emmy Ma (born January 19, 2001) is a Taiwanese-American former competitive figure skater. Representing Chinese Taipei, she is the 2021 International Challenge Cup silver medalist and 2019 Taiwanese national champion.

Earlier in her career, representing the United States, she won bronze at 2017 JGP Latvia and placed 19th at the 2018 World Junior Championships.

Personal life 
Emmy Ma was born on January 19, 2001, in Manhasset, New York. She has an older brother, Edward, and older sister, Emily. She plays violin for New England Conservatory's Youth Philharmonic Orchestra. As of 2019, Ma is a student at Boston University. She has spoken about dealing with an eating disorder, citing fellow skaters Gabrielle Daleman and Gracie Gold's openness about their own struggles as a reason to come forward.

Career 
Ma began learning to skate in 2007. She won a pewter medal in the junior ladies' event at the 2017 U.S. Championships.

For the United States 
Ma won bronze at the ISU Junior Grand Prix in Latvia in September 2017. Making her senior international debut, she placed fifth at the 2017 CS Golden Spin of Zagreb in December. In March, she competed at the 2018 World Junior Championships in Sofia, Bulgaria. She qualified to the final segment and finished 19th overall.

Competing in the senior ranks, Ma placed 16th at the 2018 U.S. Championships and 9th at the 2019 U.S. Championships. She switched to represent Taiwan from the 2019–20 season.

For Taiwan 
Ma won the 2019–20 Taiwanese national title, but did not compete internationally for Chinese Taipei. During the 2020–21 season, she did not travel to Taiwan for the 2020–21 Taiwanese Championships due to the COVID-19 pandemic. Ma was set to make her international debut for Taiwan at the 2020 CS Cup of Tyrol, but the event was cancelled due to the pandemic. She made her debut at the 2021 Challenge Cup where she won a silver medal. She placed second in the short and third in the free skate. This earned her her minimums for the 2021 World Championships, where she placed twenty-ninth.

Programs

Competitive highlights 
CS: Challenger Series; JGP: Junior Grand Prix

For Chinese Taipei

For the United States

Detailed results

For Chinese Taipei

For the United States

References 

2001 births
American female single skaters
Taiwanese female single skaters
Living people
American sportspeople of Taiwanese descent
21st-century American women